Vita Mykolayivna Yakymchuk (born April 7 1980) is a Ukrainian cross-country skier who has competed since 1998. Competing in three Winter Olympics, she earned her best finish of eighth in the  4 × 5 km relay at Turin in 2006 and had her best individual finish of 22nd in the 30 km event at those same games.

Yakymchuk's best finish at the FIS Nordic World Ski Championships was 12th twice in the  4 × 5 km relay (2007, 2009) while her best individual finish was 25th in the 7.5 km + 7.5 km double pursuit event at Oberstdorf in 2005.

Her best World Cup finish was eighth in the  4 × 5 km relay at Finland in 2001 while her best individual finish was 13th in a 15 km event at Austria in 2004.

Cross-country skiing results
All results are sourced from the International Ski Federation (FIS).

Olympic Games

World Championships

a.  Cancelled due to extremely cold weather.

World Cup

Season standings

References

External links

1980 births
Cross-country skiers at the 2002 Winter Olympics
Cross-country skiers at the 2006 Winter Olympics
Cross-country skiers at the 2010 Winter Olympics
Living people
Olympic cross-country skiers of Ukraine
Ukrainian female cross-country skiers
Universiade medalists in cross-country skiing
Universiade silver medalists for Ukraine
Cross-country skiers at the 2007 Winter Universiade